La cuccagna, internationally released as A Girl... and a Million, is a 1962 Italian drama film directed by Luciano Salce.

In 2008 it was restored and shown as part of the retrospective "Questi fantasmi: Cinema italiano ritrovato" at the 65th Venice International Film Festival.

Plot

Rossella, a beautiful young girl from a working-class family, looks for a job every day, but is disappointed to not be able to find serious employment. She meets Giuliano, a young student, who, for his part, has the will to avoid finding a job at any cost. After attempting suicide together, they make the choice to live each day without obsessing over work.

Cast 

Donatella Turri: Rossella Rubinacci
Luigi Tenco: Giuliano
Umberto D'Orsi: Dott. Giuseppe Visonà
Liù Bosisio: Diana
Gianni Dei: Natalino 
Piero Gerlini: Gallery's Owner 
Enzo Petito:  Galliano Rubinace, Rossella's father 
Corrado Olmi:  Visonà's friend 
Jean Rougeul: Cementi
Luciano Salce: the Colonel
Ugo Tognazzi: a driver (cameo)
Franco Abbina : Rossella's brother

References

External links

1962 films
Italian drama films
1962 drama films
Films directed by Luciano Salce
Films scored by Ennio Morricone
Films set in Rome
Films with screenplays by Luciano Vincenzoni
1960s Italian films